The Pyrmont Bay ferry service, officially known as F4 Pyrmont Bay, is a commuter ferry service in Sydney, New South Wales. Part of the Sydney Ferries network, it is operated by Transdev Sydney Ferries and services the Lavender Bay and Darling Harbour areas. It began operation on  25 October 2020, and replaced the western half of the F4 Cross Harbour ferry service. Emerald-class ferries and SuperCat ferries operate the service.

The F4 Pyrmont Bay follows the same stopping pattern as the ceased Darling Harbour ferry service, officially known as F4 Darling Harbour. The Darling Harbour service was operated by the State Transit Authority from its commencement in the 1980s, the Sydney Ferries Corporation from 2004, and Harbour City Ferries from 2013 until the service was replaced by the F4 Cross Harbour service on 26 November 2017. It was originally created to promote tourist and traveller pilgrimage to the Darling Harbour precinct after its redevelopment in the 1980s. First Fleet and HarbourCat ferries usually operated the service. King Street Wharf served as the route's terminus during the majority of its later lifespan before it was replaced by Barangaroo.

History

After the redevelopment of the Darling Harbour precinct in the 1980s until the late 1990s, the area was serviced by public transport with only one wharf, the Aquarium ferry wharf; adjacent to the Sydney Aquarium. The wharf was opened as part of an initiative to promote pilgrimage to the new Darling Harbour precinct and its new attractions, such as the Aquarium. It also coincided with the opening of the Sydney Monorail loop from Town Hall to Darling Harbour. Routes from Circular Quay to Aquarium and vice versa usually included stops at Darling Street Balmain / Balmain East and McMahons Point. Following the opening of the Milsons Point and Pyrmont Bay wharves in the late 90s, Darling Harbour ferries also included these stops, with Pyrmont Bay being the terminus of the route. Balmain was also included on the route after timetable changes in April 2002, as a stop between Balmain East and Aquarium. After July 2008 timetable changes, the route was briefly split into two terminuses, with Balmain East serving as a junction between a route to Balmain and a Route to Pyrmont Bay.

After a publicised fatal collision of the Sydney Ferries HarbourCat Pam Burridge and the private vessel Merinda in March 2007, resulting in the death of four people and injury of two others, a report on the Sydney Ferries Corporation, the previous operator of the Sydney Ferries system, conducted and written by Bret Walker, was commissioned by then-Premier of New South Wales Morris Iemma and released in November 2007. One of the many recommendations of the "Walker Report" was to create a new ferry terminal at Darling Harbour, to ease congestion on the network, especially at Circular Quay. The plan for the Darling Harbour service was to decommission the Aquarium wharf, leaving it for use by commercial vessels, and rerouting services from Aquarium to Darling Harbour wharf, which was already in use as a stop on the Parramatta River service. This would create a new interchange between Parramatta River and Darling Harbour services; a terminal in which was created with the December 2011 timetable change, though, Pyrmont Bay still served as the terminus of the service until the October 2013 timetable change.

In May 2013, it was announced by Transport for NSW that a new terminal servicing the redeveloped Barangaroo precinct will be built to replace the King Street Wharf terminal. The new wharf at Barangaroo was to be located a few meters north of the King Street Wharf; construction commenced in 2015/16 and opened in June 2017. Darling Harbour wharf was then decommissioned by Sydney Ferries for use for tourist and commercial purposes after the new wharf's opening. Both Darling Harbour and Parramatta River services were rerouted from the Darling Harbour to Barangaroo.

The Darling Harbour service was replaced by the F4 Cross Harbour ferry services on 26 November 2017. Following community consultation jointly held by the ferry operator Transdev Sydney Ferries and Transport for NSW in 2019–2020, the F4 Cross Harbour route was divided into F4 Pyrmont Bay and F9 Watsons Bay services on 25 October 2020. During the consultation, the new F4 was originally planned to be known as the F4 City Connector. The F4 Pyrmont Bay service follows the same stopping pattern as the Darling Harbour service.

Service

Present

2013–2017

The Darling Harbour service was officially known as the F4 Darling Harbour service since 2013, under the new Transport for NSW design and operation architecture. It was one of seven distinct routes on the Sydney Ferries network between 2013 and 2017.

When created in the 1980s, the route first consisted of stops at McMahons Point, Balmain East and Sydney Aquarium. Additional stops at Milsons Point, Balmain and Pyrmont were included on the route in the early 2000s, however, Balmain was later removed from the route and an inquiry into Sydney Ferries in 2007 advised the creation of a new terminal at Darling Harbour be built, which would become Barangaroo. 

Ferries travelling towards Barangaroo from Circular Quay departed from Wharf 5. It typically took 23 minutes to travel from Circular Quay to Darling Harbour, where the service terminated. There was a short interval between arrival and departure of ferries from Barangaroo travelling towards Circular Quay, lasting 3 minutes off-peak and 7 minutes on-peak. The Pyrmont Bay wharf could only be accessed on the Darling Harbour to Circular Quay service. Ferries travelling towards Darling Harbour did not stop at Pyrmont Bay. A trip from Darling Harbour towards Circular Quay usually lasted 27 minutes.

In 2015, both Balmain East and Pyrmont Bay were closed for reconstruction and upgrades. Balmain East was officially closed for upgrade on 14 January 2015, with the upgrade completed by May 2015. Pyrmont Bay was closed in April 2015 . The Casino wharf nearby was used to temporarily replace Pyrmont Bay during the upgrade.

Fleet

The fleet of ferries that ran the Darling Harbour service were of the First Fleet class; ferries commissioned and entered into service in 1984 to 86. The First Fleet ferries are a series of compact, catamaran double decker vessels, which include a third deck for crew, designed to carry up to 396 passengers. At the cessation of F4 Darling Harbour in 2017, there were nine First Fleet class ferries that operate on the Sydney Ferries network, however only four were used for the Darling Harbour service. First Fleet ferries were typically swapped out for use on other Inner Harbour services, though, the Golden Grove and Scarbrough were the most common of the ferries to operate on the route. HarbourCat class ferries Anne Sargeant and Pam Burridge also operated the route as backup vessels.

Patronage
The following table shows the patronage of Sydney Ferries network for the year ending 30 June 2022.

References
Notes

Citations

External links

Ferry transport in Sydney
Darling Harbour